Patrick Grant Waters (12 May 1943 – April 2008) was a Scottish footballer who played for Stirling Albion, Stranraer, Forfar Athletic, Dumbarton, Stenhousemuir and East Stirling.

References

1943 births
2008 deaths
Scottish footballers
Dumbarton F.C. players
Stirling Albion F.C. players
Stranraer F.C. players
Forfar Athletic F.C. players
Stenhousemuir F.C. players
East Stirlingshire F.C. players
Scottish Football League players
Association football forwards